Coelotes is a genus of funnel weavers first described by John Blackwall in 1841. A large number of species are found throughout Europe and Asia.

Species 
 it contains 189 species:

C. acerbus Liu, Li & Pham, 2010 – Vietnam
C. adnexus Zhang, Zhu & Wang, 2017 – China
C. aguniensis Shimojana, 2000 – Japan (Ryukyu Is.)
C. akakinaensis Shimojana, 2000 – Japan (Ryukyu Is.)
C. albimontanus Nishikawa, 2009 – Japan
C. alpinus Polenec, 1972 – Italy, Austria, Slovenia
C. amamiensis Shimojana, 1989 – Japan (Ryukyu Is.)
C. amplilamnis Saito, 1936 – China
C. antri (Komatsu, 1961) – Japan
C. arganoi Brignoli, 1978 – Turkey
C. aritai Nishikawa, 2009 – Japan
C. atropos (Walckenaer, 1830) – Europe
C. bifurcatus Okumura & Ono, 2006 – Japan
C. biprocessis Zhang, Zhu & Wang, 2017 – China
C. brachiatus Wang, Yin, Peng & Xie, 1990 – China
C. brevis Xu & Li, 2007 – China
C. capacilimbus Xu & Li, 2006 – China
C. caudatus de Blauwe, 1973 – Lebanon
C. cavicola (Komatsu, 1961) – Japan
C. charitonovi Spassky, 1939 – Central Asia
C. chenzhou Zhang & Yin, 2001 – China
C. chishuiensis Zhang, Zhu & Wang, 2017 – China
C. coenobita Brignoli, 1978 – Turkey
C. colosseus Xu & Li, 2007 – China
C. conversus Xu & Li, 2006 – China
C. cornutus Nishikawa, 2009 – Japan
C. cristiformis Jiang, Chen & Zhang, 2018 – China
C. curvilamnis Ovtchinnikov, 2000 – Kyrgyzstan
Coelotes c. alatauensis Ovtchinnikov, 2000 – Kazakhstan, Kyrgyzstan
Coelotes c. boomensis Ovtchinnikov, 2000 – Kyrgyzstan
C. cylistus Peng & Wang, 1997 – China
C. decolor Nishikawa, 1973 – Japan
C. degeneratus Liu & Li, 2009 – China
C. doii Nishikawa, 2009 – Japan
C. dormans Nishikawa, 2009 – Japan
C. eharai Arita, 1976 – Japan
C. enasanus Nishikawa, 2009 – Japan
C. everesti Hu, 2001 – China
C. exaptus Banks, 1898 – Mexico
C. exilis Nishikawa, 2009 – Japan
C. exitialis L. Koch, 1878 – Korea, Japan
C. fanjingensis Zhang, Zhu & Wang, 2017 – China
C. fujian Zhang, Zhu & Wang, 2017 – China
C. furvus Liu, Li & Pham, 2010 – Vietnam
C. galeiformis Wang, Yin, Peng & Xie, 1990 – China
C. gifuensis Nishikawa, 2009 – Japan
C. globasus (Wang, Peng & Kim, 1996) – China
C. gotoensis Okumura, 2007 – Japan
C. guttatus Wang, Yin, Peng & Xie, 1990 – China
C. hachijoensis Ono, 2008 – Japan
C. hamamurai Yaginuma, 1967 – Japan
C. hataensis Nishikawa, 2009 – Japan
C. hexommatus (Komatsu, 1957) – Japan
C. hikonensis Nishikawa, 2009 – Japan
C. hiradoensis Okumura & Ono, 2006 – Japan
C. hiratsukai Arita, 1976 – Japan
C. hiruzenensis Nishikawa, 2009 – Japan
C. hiurai Nishikawa, 2009 – Japan
C. ibukiensis Nishikawa, 2009 – Japan
C. icohamatus Zhu & Wang, 1991 – China
C. iharai Okumura, 2007 – Japan
C. iheyaensis Shimojana, 2000 – Japan (Ryukyu Is.)
C. ikiensis Nishikawa, 2009 – Japan
C. improprius (Wang, Griswold & Miller, 2010) – China
C. indentatus Zhang, Zhu & Wang, 2017 – China
C. insulanus Shimojana, 2000 – Japan (Ryukyu Is.)
C. introhamatus Xu & Li, 2006 – China
C. iriei Okumura, 2013 – Japan
C. italicus Kritscher, 1956 – Italy
C. iyoensis Nishikawa, 2009 – Japan
C. izenaensis Shimojana, 2000 – Japan (Ryukyu Is.)
C. jianfenglingensis (Liu & Li, 2009) – China
C. juglandicola Ovtchinnikov, 1984 – Kyrgyzstan
C. kagaensis Nishikawa, 2009 – Japan
C. kakeromaensis Shimojana, 2000 – Japan (Ryukyu Is.)
C. katsurai Nishikawa, 2009 – Japan
C. keramaensis Shimojana, 2000 – Japan (Ryukyu Is.)
C. kimi Kim & Park, 2009 – Korea
C. kintaroi Nishikawa, 1983 – Japan
C. kirgisicus Ovtchinnikov, 2000 – Kyrgyzstan
C. kitazawai Yaginuma, 1972 – Japan
C. koshikiensis Okumura, 2013 – Japan
C. kumejimanus Shimojana, 2000 – Japan (Ryukyu Is.)
C. kumensis Shimojana, 1989 – Japan (Ryukyu Is.)
C. lamellatus Nishikawa, 2009 – Japan
C. laohuanglongensis Liu & Li, 2009 – China
C. ledongensis Zhang, Zhu & Wang, 2017 – China
C. luculli Brignoli, 1978 – Turkey
C. maculatus Zhang, Peng & Kim, 1997 – China
C. mastrucatus Wang, Yin, Peng & Xie, 1990 – China
C. mediocris Kulczyński, 1887 – Switzerland, Italy, Ukraine?
C. micado Strand, 1907 – Japan
C. microps Schenkel, 1963 – China
C. minobusanus Nishikawa, 2009 – Japan
C. minoensis Nishikawa, 2009 – Japan
C. miyakoensis Shimojana, 2000 – Japan (Ryukyu Is.)
C. modestus Simon, 1880 – China, Japan
C. mohrii Nishikawa, 2009 – Japan
C. motobuensis Shimojana, 2000 – Japan (Ryukyu Is.)
C. multannulatus Zhang, Zhu, Sun & Song, 2006 – China
C. musashiensis Nishikawa, 1989 – Japan
C. nagaraensis Nishikawa, 2009 – Japan
C. nasensis Shimojana, 2000 – Japan (Ryukyu Is.)
C. nazuna Nishikawa, 2009 – Japan
C. nenilini Ovtchinnikov, 1999 – Uzbekistan
C. ningmingensis Peng, Yan, Liu & Kim, 1998 – China
C. noctulus Wang, Yin, Peng & Xie, 1990 – China
C. notoensis Nishikawa, 2009 – Japan
C. obako Nishikawa, 1983 – Japan
C. obtusangulus Luo & Chen, 2015 – China
C. ogatai Nishikawa, 2009 – Japan
C. okinawensis Shimojana, 1989 – Japan (Ryukyu Is.)
C. osamui Nishikawa, 2009 – Japan
C. osellai de Blauwe, 1973 – Italy
C. oshimaensis Shimojana, 2000 – Japan (Ryukyu Is.)
C. oxyacanthus Okumura, 2013 – Japan
C. pabulator Simon, 1875 – France, Switzerland
C. pastoralis Ovtchinnikov, 2000 – Kazakhstan, Kyrgyzstan
C. pedodentalis Zhang, Zhu, Sun & Song, 2006 – China
C. perbrevis Liu, Li & Pham, 2010 – Vietnam
C. personatus Nishikawa, 1973 – Japan
C. pervicax Hu & Li, 1987 – China
C. phthisicus Brignoli, 1978 – Turkey
C. pickardi O. Pickard-Cambridge, 1873 – Switzerland, Italy
Coelotes p. carpathensis Ovtchinnikov, 1999 – Ukraine
Coelotes p. pastor Simon, 1875 – France
Coelotes p. tirolensis (Kulczyński, 1906) – Switzerland, Italy, Ukraine?
C. poleneci Wiehle, 1964 – Austria, Slovenia
C. polyedricus Liu, Li & Pham, 2010 – Vietnam
C. poricus Zhang, Zhu & Wang, 2017 – China
C. poweri Simon, 1875 – France
C. processus Xu & Li, 2007 – China
C. progressoridentes Ovtchinnikov, 2000 – Kyrgyzstan
C. quadratus Wang, Yin, Peng & Xie, 1990 – China
C. rhododendri Brignoli, 1978 – Turkey
C. robustior Nishikawa, 2009 – Japan
C. robustus Wang, Yin, Peng & Xie, 1990 – China
C. rudolfi (Schenkel, 1925) – Switzerland
C. rugosus (Wang, Peng & Kim, 1996) – China
C. saccatus Peng & Yin, 1998 – China
C. saikaiensis Okumura, 2013 – Japan
C. sanoi Nishikawa, 2009 – Japan
C. sawadai Nishikawa, 2009 – Japan
C. septus Wang, Yin, Peng & Xie, 1990 – China
C. serpentinus Jiang, Chen & Zhang, 2018 – China
C. shimajiriensis Shimojana, 2000 – Japan (Ryukyu Is.)
C. simplex O. Pickard-Cambridge, 1885 – China (Yarkand)
C. sinopensis Danişman, Karanfil & Coşar, 2016 – Turkey
C. sinuolatus Zhang, Zhu & Wang, 2017 – China
C. solitarius L. Koch, 1868 – Europe
C. songae Liu, Li & Pham, 2010 – Vietnam
C. sordidus Ovtchinnikov, 2000 – Kazakhstan, Kyrgyzstan
C. striatilamnis Ovtchinnikov, 2000 – Kazakhstan, Kyrgyzstan
Coelotes s. ketmenensis Ovtchinnikov, 2001 – Kazakhstan
C. stylifer Caporiacco, 1935 – Kashmir
C. suruga Nishikawa, 2009 – Japan
C. suthepicus Dankittipakul, Chami-Kranon & Wang, 2005 – Thailand
C. takanawaensis Nishikawa, 2009 – Japan
C. taurus Nishikawa, 2009 – Japan
C. tegenarioides O. Pickard-Cambridge, 1885 – China (Yarkand)
C. tenutubilaris Zhang, Zhu & Wang, 2017 – China
C. terrestris (Wider, 1834) – Europe, Turkey
C. tiantangensis Luo & Chen, 2015 – China
C. tiantongensis Zhang, Peng & Kim, 1997 – China
C. titaniacus Brignoli, 1977 – Greece
C. tochigiensis Nishikawa, 2009 – Japan
C. tojoi Nishikawa, 2009 – Japan
C. tokaraensis Shimojana, 2000 – Japan (Ryukyu Is.)
C. tokunoshimaensis Shimojana, 2000 – Japan (Ryukyu Is.)
C. tominagai Nishikawa, 2009 – Japan
C. tonakiensis Shimojana, 2000 – Japan (Ryukyu Is.)
C. transiliensis Ovtchinnikov, 2000 – Kazakhstan, Kyrgyzstan
C. troglocaecus Shimojana & Nishihira, 2000 – Japan (Okinawa)
C. turkestanicus Ovtchinnikov, 1999 – Russia (Europe) to Central Asia
C. uncatus Liu & Li, 2009 – China
C. undulatus Hu & Wang, 1990 – China
C. unicatus Yaginuma, 1977 – Japan
C. unzenensis Okumura, 2013 – Japan
C. uozumii Nishikawa, 2002 – Japan
C. vallei Brignoli, 1977 – Italy
C. vestigialis Xu & Li, 2007 – China
C. vignai Brignoli, 1978 – Turkey
C. wangi Chen & Zhao, 1997 – China
C. xinjiangensis Hu, 1992 – China
C. yaginumai Nishikawa, 1972 – Japan
C. yahagiensis Nishikawa, 2009 – Japan
C. yambaruensis Shimojana, 2000 – Japan (Ryukyu Is.)
C. yodoensis Nishikawa, 1977 – Japan
C. zaoensis Nishikawa, 2009 – Japan

References

External links 

Agelenidae
Araneomorphae genera
Spiders of Asia